Seán Hogan (13 May 1901 – 24 December 1968) was one of the leaders of the 3rd Tipperary Brigade of the Irish Republican Army during the War of Independence.

Early life
Hogan was born on 13 May 1901, the elder child of Matthew Hogan of Greenane, Kilmucklin, County Tipperary, and Johanna Corbett. Seán had one younger brother, Matthew. He was baptized John Joseph Hogan. The 1911 census shows Hogan living in Stockaun, adjacent to Greenane in South West Tipperary, 2–3 miles north of Tipperary Town. He attended the local national school and was taught Irish language and history by Cormac Breathnach who also taught several other local students who would become prominent in the nationalist movement including Seán Treacy, Dan Breen, and Dinny Lacey. Hogan's father died in 1916.

Seán joined the local Volunteers and was a member of the Donohill company of the Tipperary Third Brigade. In early 1918 he was assigned to work with Dan Breen. After Seán Treacy's release from jail in mid 1918, Hogan arranged for the use of a shed on his cousin's dairy farm in Greenane which Treacy, Breen and Hogan used as their base for planning future activity and testing explosives. The shed was commonly referred to as the "Tin Hut". The planning for Soloheadbeg ambush took place at the "Tin Hut" and it was a regular meeting place for prominent members of the local brigade.

War of Independence

Soloheadbeg

On 21 January 1919, Dan Breen, Seán Treacy, Séumas Robinson, Hogan, Tadhg Crowe, Patrick McCormack, Patrick O'Dwyer and Michael Ryan helped to ignite the conflict that was to become the Irish War of Independence. They shot dead two members of the Royal Irish Constabulary (RIC) – Constables McDonnell and O’Connell – during the ambush in County Tipperary. The RIC men were transporting gelignite explosives, when they were called on to surrender they took up firing positions but were shot dead by the ambush party. As a result of the action, South Tipperary was placed under martial law and declared a Special Military Area under the Defence of the Realm Act. Treacy, Breen and Hogan took the cart and hid the explosives and immediately 'went on the run'. They met up again with Robinson a few weeks later and "the big four" as they were referred to in Ireland at the time, remained in hiding over the coming months, moving from house to house of sympathisers or sleeping-in-the-rough in the countryside.

A large police and military manhunt was launched to find them. A thousand-pound reward was offered for information leading to their capture, this was later raised to ten thousand pounds. The Police Gazette, ‘The Hue and Cry' regularly published accurate descriptions of the wanted men. The houses of known or suspected nationalists were ransacked by the RIC. Relatives and friends of the men on the run were a particular target.

"By February, 1919, the R.I.C. were very bitter because none of us had been captured and I got reports of torture to civilians, including Hogan's and Breen's relatives."

Hogan’s younger brother Matthew, aged 15, was imprisoned with his school friend John Connors and his brother Tim Connors (aged 11) whose father worked on Seán Treacy's mother's farm, for 3 months without trial, on the suspicion that they knew where Seán and the others were. Hogan’s mother was also imprisoned for a period in an attempt to extract information.

Treacy and Robinson travelled to Dublin and met with Michael Collins who offered to arrange for them and Breen and Hogan to escape to America.  They rejected the offer and told Collins they would remain in Ireland and continue the fight.

Knocklong

Hogan was arrested on 12 May 1919 by the RIC after attending a dance near Clonoulty, Tipperary. His three comrades (Dan Breen, Seán Treacy and Séumas Robinson) were joined by five men from the East Limerick Brigade (Ned & JJ O'Brien, Seán Lynch, Ed Foley & James Scanlon) in order to organise Hogan's rescue. He was being transported by train to Cork on 13 May 1919, and the men, led by Treacy, boarded the train in Knocklong. A close-range shoot-out followed on the train. Treacy and Breen were seriously wounded in the gun fight, two policemen died, but Hogan was rescued. He was spirited away to Knocklong village where his handcuffs were cleaved by the local butcher. The rescue was a great morale boost for the Republican cause in the early stage of the war, within weeks a number of ballads were being sung across Ireland regarding the rescue. There was an extensive police and military search for the participants of the rescue. ‘The big four’ were quickly moved to West Limerick where Treacy and Breen recuperated in the houses of members and friends of the West Limerick Brigade. They also spent time in Clare and Cork before relocating to Dublin in the middle of 1919. Two IRA prisoners Ed Foley (one of the rescuers) and Patrick Maher (who had no part in the rescue) were later executed by the British in Mountjoy jail after the rescue after being convicted in courts-martial.

Dublin

The four Tipperary men undertook a range of missions under the direction of the Dublin leadership, some of these missions were in association with a unit known as The Squad.  Plans were made and ambush positions taken for a number of attacks on Lord French, the Viceroy of Ireland who also served as Commander-in-Chief, Ireland, in the second half of 1919, however, the intelligence received about French's movements was inaccurate and these ambushes did not occur until the ambush at Ashtown Road. In one of these planned ambush attempts Hogan waited on Grattan Bridge for French's car to pass. At the time French's car was due to pass he pulled the pins from his grenade. French's car failed to turn up as expected and he had to hold down the firing mechanism of the grenade for over an hour until he reached a safe house and new pins could be placed in the grenades.

In December 1919 Hogan, Treacy, Breen, Robinson, Martin Savage and a number of Dublin volunteers under the leadership of Paddy Daly undertook an ambush on Lord French's motorcade of three cars at Ashtown Road in Dublin.  While three of French's party, two RIC and a driver, were wounded French got through unharmed, while Martin Savage was killed and Breen wounded. Hogan remained primarily based in Dublin until early 1920, although he made several trips to Tipperary to attend Brigade meetings and participate in a number of the raids on RIC barracks there.

West Limerick
In the spring of 1920, Hogan made two trips to west Limerick. On one visit Hogan participated with members of the West Limerick Brigade in activities including the attack led by the West Limerick Brigade OC Sean Finn in Rathkeale on the Hibernian Hotel in which Sergeant Neazor of the RIC was killed and a constable wounded. Later Hogan came from Dublin with Finn to help identify a suspected spy. The spy had been operating in the west Limerick area under the assumed name of Peadar Clancy of Dublin GHQ, stating that he was a friend of Hogan, Breen and Treacy. Several members of the West Limerick Brigade became suspicious and when he moved to Kerry they sent word to monitor him. He was arrested in Kerry and brought back to Limerick for trial. Hogan knew the real Peadar Clancy, who was executed later in the year by the British in Dublin Castle. It was discovered that the person's real name was John Crowley who had been on the trail of Hogan, Treacy and Breen. Crowley was identified by Hogan and executed by the West Limerick Brigade as a spy.

Back in Tipperary
Hogan returned full-time to Tipperary in the middle of 1920, initially serving as a Brigade Officer. He was tasked by Brigade HQ with reorganizing the activities of 6th and 7th battalions and was made interim O/C of the 6th Battalion, as the previous O/C Ed McGrath had been imprisoned. In September 1920, Hogan and Seán Treacy travelled to Dublin for a meeting with GHQ on the formation of Flying Columns. After the meeting Hogan returned to Tipperary, but Treacy remained in Dublin and was killed in action the following month. In December 1920, Hogan was made O/C of the Brigade's 2nd Flying Column. Jack Nagle was Vice O/C and Maurice McGrath was the Flying Column's Adjutant. Dan Breen, who was recuperating from the wounds he received at Drumconda, stayed with the column for a number of weeks while it was being established and assisted Hogan with its formation and training. The column became active in January 1921 and operated mainly in the Southern part of the Brigade area. The column also undertook activities in Kilkenny and North Cork

Truce and Civil War

During the early part of the truce period Hogan was based mainly in Dublin, although he travelled to the North of the country to assist with the training of Brigades there, including assisting at an IRA training camp at Sperrin, Co. Tyrone with Dan Breen. In December 1921, disheartened by the terms of the treaty, he traveled to the US with Dan Breen. In March 1922 republican leader Liam Lynch requested they return to Ireland as the tensions between those who supported and were against the treaty were rising.  Breen and Hogan arrived back in Ireland in April 1922.

After the fall of the Four Courts and Dublin to the Free State army at the start of the Irish Civil War, Hogan returned to the East Limerick/South Tipperary area. He was later captured by Free State troops in Limerick and interned in Mountjoy jail in Dublin.

Post-war life
After the war Hogan returned to farming in Tipperary.  Hogan tried farming in County Dublin, but this venture did not succeed. He also worked for the Board of Works and as an usher in the Dáil. He married Christina Butler, a nurse and Cumann na mBan member, on 24 February 1925 at Our Lady of Refuge church in Rathmines Dublin. His brother Matthew was best man and the bride's sister, Alice, was bridesmaid. The couple had three sons; Hugh, Thomas and Seán, but later separated.

The revolutionary years had taken a toll on his mental and physical health and in later years he was in poor circumstances, living on his own in North Great George's Street, Dublin. Hogan stayed with Séumas Robinson and his family in their house on Highfield Road for 6 months. He died aged sixty-seven on Christmas Eve, 1968. He was buried with full military honours in the family grave at St. Michael's Cemetery, Tipperary town.

In popular culture
Hogan is mentioned in the Irish folk ballad "The Galtee Mountain Boy", along with Seán Moylan, Dinny Lacey and Dan Breen. The song, written by Patsy Halloran, recalls some of the travels of a "Flying column" from Tipperary as they fought during the Irish War of Independence, and later against the pro-Treaty side during the Irish Civil War.

A song about Hogan's rescue at Knocklong was recorded by Irish folk singer Johnny Donegan and Limerick band Clover.

A biography of Hogan's life titled Seán Hogan His Life: A Troubled Journey written by Tipperary historian John Connors was published in 2019.

In 2022, Tom Hennessy published Seán Hogan's Flying Column , an examination of the first march under arms of the 3rd Tipperary Brigade and the local families who aided them.

References

Bibliography
 Sean Treacy and the Third Tipperary Brigade I.R.A.- Desmond Ryan -Kerryman Limited, 1945 
 My Fight for Irish Freedom - Dan Breen - Talbot, 1926 
 Irish Bureau of Military History - Witness Statement 1394 - Jack Nagle
 Irish Bureau of Military History - Witness Statement 1701- Maurice Mcgrath
 Irish Bureau of Military History - Witness Statement 1721 - Séumas Robinson

External links

Grattan Bridge assassination attempt
Remembering the past: Martin Savage and the Ashtown Ambush
Knocklong Rescue
Republican News
The station of Knocklong song

Irish Republican Army (1919–1922) members
People of the Irish War of Independence
1901 births
1968 deaths
People from County Tipperary